

Current listings

|}

References 

 
Gilliam County